Elland was a parliamentary constituency in the West Riding of Yorkshire that existed between 1885 and 1950. It elected one Member of Parliament (MP) to the House of Commons, by the first-past-the-post voting system.

Situated between Bradford in the North, Halifax in the West, and Huddersfield to the south, it included the mining town of Brighouse and the wool centre of Elland. With a sizeable Nonconformist population (estimated at 15 per cent in 1922), it was natural Liberal territory, and was a fairly safe Liberal and later Labour seat, falling to the Conservatives only in the 'khaki election' of 1918 and the Labour collapse of 1931. In the 1918 redistribution it lost some territory and it was abolished in 1950. A sizeable part of the area was transferred to the new Brighouse and Spenborough seat.

Boundaries
1885–1918:

1918–1950: The Municipal Borough of Brighouse, the Urban Districts of Clayton, Elland, Greetland, Hipperholme, Queensberry, Shelf, Southowram, and Stainland, and the Rural District of Halifax except the parish of Norland.

Members of Parliament

Elections

Elections in the 1880s

Elections in the 1890s

Elections in the 1900s

Elections in the 1910s

General Election 1914–15:

Another General Election was required to take place before the end of 1915. The political parties had been making preparations for an election to take place and by the July 1914, the following candidates had been selected; 
Liberal: Charles Trevelyan
Unionist: George Taylor Ramsden

Elections in the 1920s

Elections in the 1930s

Elections in the 1940s
General Election 1939–40:
Another General Election was required to take place before the end of 1940. The political parties had been making preparations for an election to take place from 1939 and by the end of this year, the following candidates had been selected:

Conservative: Thomas Levy 
Labour: Gilbert Mitchison

See also
 Elland, a market town in England
 Ellands, a surname

References

 Michael Kinnear, The British Voter: An Atlas and Survey Since 1885 (London: Batsford Academic and Educational Ltd., 1981, 2nd ed.)

Parliamentary constituencies in Yorkshire and the Humber (historic)
Constituencies of the Parliament of the United Kingdom established in 1885
Constituencies of the Parliament of the United Kingdom disestablished in 1950
Elland